Ali Reza Pahlavi, Ali-Reza Pahlavi, or Alireza Pahlavi may refer to:

Ali Reza Pahlavi (born 1922) (1922–1954), a member of the Pahlavi imperial family, who died in a plane crash
Ali Reza Pahlavi (born 1966) (1966–2011), a member of the Pahlavi imperial family